Laila Al Shaikhli is an Iraqi anchorwoman and television presenter on Al Jazeera.

Early life
Shaikhli was born in Baghdad in 1965 to an Iraqi father and Danish mother, raised in Saudi Arabia and educated in England and the United States and obtained a Bachelor's degree in Computer Science from the University of Pittsburgh, Pennsylvania.

Journalism career
Shaikhli started her media career in 1990 in Washington as a broadcaster for Arab American TV. After joining the BBC World Service in London in 1994, Shaikhli went on to anchor several programs in various Arab satellite stations, where she then joined the Middle East Broadcasting Center in 1996 and later Abu Dhabi TV in 1999. Her shows include Dialogue with the West (MBC), Agenda (MBC), Dunnia (ADTV) and Panorama (ADTV).

She hosted "A day in the life of Iraqi women" in 2007 as a Everywoman special alongside fellow Iraqi activist Houzan Mahmoud, in which they discuss the lives of Iraqi women under the US-led occupation.

Accolades
Shaikhli was ranked 75th in the Most Influential Arab Rank List in 2008.

Personal life
Shaikhli is married to Iraqi host on Al Jazeera, Jasim Al-Azzawi.

References

1965 births
Living people
Al Jazeera people
Iraqi broadcast news analysts
Iraqi television presenters
People from Baghdad
Iraqi women journalists
Iraqi journalists
20th-century Iraqi women writers
20th-century Iraqi writers
21st-century Iraqi women writers
21st-century Iraqi writers
Iraqi people of Danish descent
Women television journalists
Iraqi women television presenters